Ivan Baranka (born 19 May 1985) is a Slovak former professional ice hockey defenceman who played in the National Hockey League (NHL) with the New York Rangers.

Playing career
Baranka was drafted 50th overall in 2003 NHL Entry Draft by the New York Rangers. Prior to that he was a member of the Everett Silvertips in the WHL for two seasons.

Baranka signed his first pro contract with the Rangers on 15 September 2004. After spending 3 full seasons with the Hartford Wolf Pack of the AHL, Baranka played his first NHL game with the Rangers on 21 November 2007, in which he recorded his first point on an assist of Colton Orr's goal against the Tampa Bay Lightning.

On 15 May 2008, the Rangers confirmed that Ivan Baranka accepted an offer from Spartak Moscow, but that the Rangers will retain his rights.

Career statistics

Regular season and playoffs

International

References

External links
 

1985 births
Living people
People from Ilava
Sportspeople from the Trenčín Region
Everett Silvertips players
Hartford Wolf Pack players
HC Kometa Brno players
HC Spartak Moscow players
HK Dubnica players
Ice hockey players at the 2010 Winter Olympics
New York Rangers draft picks
New York Rangers players
Olympic ice hockey players of Slovakia
Slovak ice hockey defencemen
Slovak expatriate ice hockey players in Russia
Avangard Omsk players
Ice hockey players at the 2014 Winter Olympics
Salavat Yulaev Ufa players
HC Slovan Bratislava players
Rögle BK players
HC Vítkovice players
Slovak expatriate ice hockey players in Sweden
Ice hockey players at the 2018 Winter Olympics
Slovak expatriate ice hockey players in the Czech Republic
Slovak expatriate ice hockey players in the United States